Thomas Kittera (March 21, 1789 – June 16, 1839) was a member of the United States House of Representatives from Pennsylvania.

Biography

Thomas Kittera was the son of John Wilkes Kittera.  He was born in Lancaster, Pennsylvania.  He graduated from the University of Pennsylvania at Philadelphia in 1805.  He studied law, was admitted to the bar in 1808 and commenced practice in Philadelphia.  He served as deputy attorney general of Pennsylvania in 1817 and 1818 and  deputy attorney general of Philadelphia from 1824 to 1826.  He was a member of the select council and its president from 1824 to 1825.

Kittera was elected as an Adams candidate to the Nineteenth Congress to fill the vacancy caused by the resignation of Joseph Hemphill.  At the same election he was an unsuccessful candidate for election to the Twentieth Congress.  He died in Philadelphia in 1839.  He was interred in St. Paul’s Protestant Episcopal Church Cemetery and reinterred to Mount Moriah Cemetery in 1870.

He is the father-in-law of Philadelphia mayor, Robert Taylor Conrad.

References

External links

The Political Graveyard

1789 births
1839 deaths
Burials at Mount Moriah Cemetery (Philadelphia)
University of Pennsylvania alumni
Politicians from Lancaster, Pennsylvania
Pennsylvania lawyers
National Republican Party members of the United States House of Representatives from Pennsylvania
19th-century American politicians
19th-century American lawyers